Arxellia is a genus of sea snails, marine gastropod mollusks, in the family Solariellidae.

Species
Species within the genus Arxellia include:
 Arxellia boucheti Vilvens, Williams & Herbert, 2014
 Arxellia erythrea Vilvens, Williams & Herbert, 2014
 Arxellia helicoides Vilvens, Williams & Herbert, 2014
 Arxellia herosae Vilvens, Williams & Herbert, 2014
 Arxellia maestratii Vilvens, Williams & Herbert, 2014
 Arxellia tenorioi (Poppe, Tagaro & Dekker, 2006)
 Arxellia thaumasta Vilvens, Williams & Herbert, 2014
 Arxellia tracheia Vilvens, Williams & Herbert, 2014
 Arxellia trochos Vilvens, Williams & Herbert, 2014

References

Solariellidae
Gastropod genera